Malaysia competed in the 1998 Commonwealth Games as the host nation in Kuala Lumpur from 11 to 21 September 1998.

Medal summary

Medals by sport

Multiple medalists
Malaysian competitors that have won at least two medals.

Medallists
The following Malaysian competitors won medals at the games; all dates are for September 1998.

Athletics

Men
Track and road events

Field events

Women
Track and road events

Key
Note–Ranks given for track events are within the athlete's heat only
Q = Qualified for the next round
q = Qualified for the next round as a fastest loser or, in field events, by position without achieving the qualifying target
NR = National record
N/A = Round not applicable for the event
Bye = Athlete not required to compete in round

Badminton

Men's team
Pool A

Final round

Women's team
Pool A

Final round

Boxing

Men

Cricket

Men's tournament

Ranked 16th in final standings

Cycling

Road

Track
Sprint

Pursuit

Time trial

Points race

Diving

Men

Women

Gymnastics

Artistic
Men

Women

Rhythmic

Hockey

Men's tournament

Pool B

Semifinal

Gold medal match

Ranked 2nd in final standings

Women's tournament

Pool A

Ranked 7th in final standings

Lawn bowls

Men

Women

Netball

Women's tournament
Group A

Rugby sevens

Men's tournament
Malaysia has qualified a rugby sevens team.

Pool D

Plate
Pool B

Shooting

Men
Pistol/Small bore

Shotgun

Full bore

Women
Pistol/Small bore

Squash

Individual

Doubles

Swimming

Men

Women

Synchronized swimming

Ten-pin bowling

Weightlifting

Men

References

Malaysia at the Commonwealth Games
Nations at the 1998 Commonwealth Games
1998 in Malaysian sport